is a Japanese surname. Notable people with the surname include:

 , Japanese pop singer
 , Japanese volleyball player
 , Japanese rugby union player
 , Japanese singer and songwriter
 , Japanese singer

Fictional characters
 Ami Onuki, a character in the Japanese-American animated television series Hi Hi Puffy AmiYumi, based on the Japanese pop singer by the same name
 Keiko Onuki, a character in the Battle Royale manga series

See also
 Ōnuki Station, railway station located in Futtsu, Chiba Prefecture, Japan

Japanese-language surnames